A whore is a person who works in the business of prostitution.

Whore(s) may also refer to:

Film, television, and theatre
Whore (1991 film), a British-American film directed by Ken Russell
The Whores, a 1994 Italian film directed by Aurelio Grimaldi
Whore (2004 film), a Spanish film directed by María Lidón
Whore (2008 film), an American film directed by Thomas Dekker
The Whore (2009 film), a Norwegian film directed by Reinert Kiil
The Whore (2010 film), a German television film directed by Hansjörg Thurn
"Whore" (Spartacus: Blood and Sand), a television episode
Whores (play), a 2005 play by Lee Blessing

Music
Whores (band), an American noise rock band
Whore (album) or the title song, by Dalbello, 1996
"Whore" (song), by In This Moment, 2013
"Whore", a song by Get Scared from Best Kind of Mess, 2011

See also
Whore of Babylon